Albert Gallatin Riddle (May 28, 1816 – May 15, 1902) was a U.S. Representative from Ohio.

Early life
Born in Monson, Massachusetts, Riddle moved with his parents to Newbury, in the Western Reserve of Ohio, in 1817. He completed preparatory studies, and then studied law.

Career
Riddle was admitted to the bar in 1840 and began practice in Geauga County, serving as prosecuting attorney of that county 1840-1846.  He served as member of the Ohio House of Representatives 1848-1850, and in 1848 called the first Free Soil convention in Ohio.

Riddle moved to Cleveland, Ohio, in 1850.  He was elected prosecuting attorney in 1856, and in 1859 he defended the Oberlin slave rescuers. He served as a Republican in the Thirty-seventh Congress (March 4, 1861 – March 3, 1863), making speeches in favor of arming slaves, the first on this subject that were delivered in Congress, and others on emancipation in the District of Columbia and in vindication of President Lincoln. He was not a candidate for renomination in 1862.

After his term in Congress, Riddle served as consul at Matanzas, Cuba, in 1863 and 1864.  He then returned to Washington, D.C., and again engaged in the practice of law.  He was retained by the State Department to aid in the prosecution of John H. Surratt as one of the accomplices in the murder of President Abraham Lincoln.  He also served as law officer of the District of Columbia 1877-1889. He was in charge of the law department at Howard University for several years after its establishment.

Death and legacy
Riddle died at his home in Washington, D.C. on May 15, 1902. He was interred in Rock Creek Cemetery.

His papers are at the Western Reserve Historical Society, Cleveland, Ohio. They include the unpublished manuscript Accounts of experiences in Cuba (1862-1864).

Works
 Students and Lawyers, lectures (Washington, 1873)
 Bart Ridgeley, a Story of Northern Ohio (Boston, 1873)
 The Portrait, a Romance of Cuyahoga Valley (1874)
 Alice Brand, a Tale of the Capitol (New York, 1875)
 Life, Character, and Public Services of James A. Garfield (Cleveland, 1880)
 The House of Ross (Boston, 1881)
 Castle Gregory (Cleveland, 1882)
 Hart and his Bear (Washington, 1883)
 The Young Sugar Makers of the West Woods (Cleveland, 1885)
 The Hunter of the Chagrin (1882)
 Mark Loan, a Tale of the Western Reserve (1883)
 Old Newberry and the Pioneers (1884)
 Speeches and Arguments (Washington, 1886)
 Life of Benjamin F. Wade (Cleveland, 1886)
 Recollections of War Times, 1860-65
 Ansel's Cave: A Story of Early Life in the Western Reserve (Cleveland, 1893)

References

External links
 
 

1816 births
1902 deaths
Ohio lawyers
People from Monson, Massachusetts
People from Geauga County, Ohio
Politicians from Cleveland
People associated with the assassination of Abraham Lincoln
Republican Party members of the Ohio House of Representatives
County district attorneys in Ohio
19th-century American diplomats
Writers from Massachusetts
Writers from Cleveland
American consuls
19th-century American politicians
Burials at Rock Creek Cemetery
Republican Party members of the United States House of Representatives from Ohio